Rajchman is a surname; it is a Polish respelling of the German Reichmann, typically used by
Jews in Congress Poland, while those in Galicia and Prussian Poland were
more likely to use the original German spelling. Notable people with the surname include:

 Jan A. Rajchman (1911-1989), Polish-American electrical engineer and computer pioneer
 John Rajchman (born 1946), American philosopher of art history, architecture, and continental philosophy
 Ludwik Rajchman (1881-1965),  Polish bacteriologist and one of the founders of UNICEF
 Aleksander Rajchman (1890-1940), Polish mathematician

See also 
 Reichmann
 Richman

Polish-language surnames
Jewish surnames
Germanic-language surnames
Yiddish-language surnames